Herochroma baba is a species of moth of the family Geometridae first described by Charles Swinhoe in 1893. It is found in China (Hubei, Hunan, Guangdong, Guangxi), north-eastern India, Nepal, northern Vietnam and Peninsular Malaysia.

References

External links
 "A study on the genus Herochroma Swinhoe in China, with descriptions of four new species (Lepidoptera: Geometridae: Geometrinae)". Acta Entomologica Sinica

Moths described in 1893
Pseudoterpnini
Moths of Asia